Mealli is an Italian surname. Notable people with the surname include:

Bruno Mealli (born 1937), former Italian cyclist
Fabrizia Mealli (born 1966), Italian statistician
Giovanni Antonio Pandolfi Mealli (c. 1630–c. 1669/1670), Italian composer and violinist

Italian-language surnames